Black Harbour is a Canadian television series, which ran on CBC Television from 1996 to 1999.

The show starred Rebecca Jenkins as Katherine Hubbard, a successful restaurant owner who returned to live in her Nova Scotia hometown to be with her mother who had suffered a heart attack. Her husband Geraint Wyn Davies, followed her with their two kids. Alex Carter also starred as Hubbard's high school sweetheart Paul Isler, whose own marriage was on the rocks and who was employed by Katherine's brother at the boatyard.

In the show's final season, Hubbard and Isler's marriages had both failed, and they officially rekindled their old relationship.

Cast
Rebecca Jenkins as Katherine Hubbard
Alex Carter as Paul Isler 
Joseph Ziegler as Len Hubbard
Geraint Wyn Davies as Nick Haskell

Episodes

Season 1: 1996–97

Season 2: 1997–98

Season 3: 1998–99

External links

Fan Site
 

1996 Canadian television series debuts
1999 Canadian television series endings
1990s Canadian drama television series
CBC Television original programming
Television shows set in Nova Scotia